The Tamil New Tigers (TNT) was a militant Tamil organization founded by Velupillai Prabhakaran on May 22, 1972. The group was composed of a few close associates of Prabhakaran, who was 17 years old when he founded the group. They initially carried out several small scale attacks, including the bombing of a carnival at the Duraiappa Stadium in 1972, and several explosions during Prime Minister Sirimavo Bandaranaike's visit to Jaffna in 1974. The group gained notoriety in 1975 when Prabhakaran and three other members assassinated Alfred Duraiappah, the Mayor of Jaffna.

The group continued to carry out attacks and a string of bank robberies after the assassination, and the Sri Lanka Police were issued orders to arrest all members of the group. Wanting to form a guerrilla group, Prabhakaran created the Liberation Tigers of Tamil Eelam on May 5, 1976, thereby disbanding the Tamil New Tigers.

See also
Tamil militant groups
Liberation Tigers of Tamil Eelam

References

External links
Sri Lanka Ministry of Defence

Factions in the Sri Lankan Civil War
Sri Lankan rebels
Organizations established in 1972